Franz Heim (Frankfurt am Main, 13 February 1907 – 19 February 1944), promoted on 1 May 1943, was a German Nazi SS-Standartenführer (member no. 18,376), member of NSDAP (no. 352,548), serving from September 1941 as Deputy Commander of the Security Police (SIPO) and the SD for the General Government in occupied Poland, headed by the SS-Oberführer Eberhard Schöngarth in Kraków (Cracow).

Heim became known in contemporary Holocaust historiography because of the Höfle Telegram, which was intercepted and decoded by the British.  He was the listed recipient of the Aktion Reinhard tally of 1,274,166 Jews murdered in the gas chambers of four death camps during the deadliest phase of the Holocaust in Poland.  At the time, Heim held the rank of Obersturmbannführer.  The top secret radiogram was sent to him from the city of Lublin by Sturmbannführer Hermann Höfle on 11 January 1943 confirming the progress of the Final Solution of the Jewish Question.

References

Holocaust perpetrators in Poland
SS-Standartenführer
1907 births
1944 deaths